Mastixia cuspidata is a tree in the family Nyssaceae. The specific epithet  is from the Latin meaning "sharp-pointed", referring to the leaf apex.

Description
The smooth to fissured bark is greyish to brown. The flowers are green to yellow.

Distribution and habitat
Mastixia cuspidata grows naturally in Sumatra, Peninsular Malaysia and Borneo. Its habitat is mixed dipterocarp forests from sea-level to  altitude.

References

cuspidata
Trees of Sumatra
Trees of Peninsular Malaysia
Trees of Borneo
Plants described in 1851
Taxa named by Carl Ludwig Blume